The Black String is a 2018 American psychological horror-thriller film created by Brian Hanson (co-writer, director) and Richard Handley (co-writer, producer, actor), starring Frankie Muniz, Blake Webb, Chelsea Edmundson, Richard Handley, Cullen Douglas, Colby French, Laura Richardson, and Mary K. DeVault.

The film was announced in 2016 and debuted opening night of the 2018 Austin Film Festival and was later purchased by Lionsgate Home Entertainment, for North American distribution in 2019. From 2019 to 2021, the film was also released for Video on Demand (VOD), DVD, and Blu-ray worldwide.

Plot 
Jonathan Marsh is a lonely twenty-something, working night shifts at a local liquor store with his friend and shift manager, Eric, “The ERC.” One night at his apartment Jonathan is summoned through his TV by a seductive woman, beckoning him to come “meet sexy singles in his neighborhood” and call the 1-900 number on his screen. Soon, Jonathan finds himself on a blind date at Jenny's Diner with Dena. She coerces him to take her to his apartment, where they engage in a one-night stand. The next morning, Jonathan awakens alone in his apartment, no sign of Dena, but he does discover an uncomfortable and unsightly rash on his abdomen.

Looking for answers, he returns to Dena's but is greeted by a suspicious man who denies she lives there. Jonathan's paranoia increases when he is stricken with nightmarish visions. His physical symptoms worsen as well, eventually spreading to his arm. Unable to sleep, Jonathan returns to Jenny's Diner, where he receives a phone call from his friend, Eric, who tells him he's in trouble and to come over to his place immediately.

Jonathan arrives at Eric's to find his front door ajar and Eric not home. Jonathan goes inside to search for him. In Eric's room he's attacked by an unknown assailant. The police arrive and arrest Jonathan. Jonathan finds himself in the care of psychiatrist, Dr. Jason Ronaldi, who provides family counseling and commits him to a 3-day hospital stay. Ultimately, Jonathan is released into the care of his parents. His first night at home, while sleeping, he awakens to find a mysterious black, bubbling ooze on his bedroom wall. His paranoia escalates and he absconds from his parents' house. The next morning he awakens in an abandoned field.

He makes his way to an occult book store where he receives instructions to meet with Miss Melinda at Blue High Shack. That night at Blue High Shack, Miss Melinda tells him he's been the victim of a witch cult and coaches him through a ritual, involving a ceremonial dagger, meant to rid his body of the “evil” (black string) that has been implanted in him by Dena and the cult. It's a painful ordeal and Jonathan is unsuccessful in his attempt to remove the string. He returns to Miss Melinda at the occult book store demanding an explanation. She tells him to return to Dena and the witch cult for answers.

Jonathan returns to Dena's house. Ensuring no one is home, he sneaks into the house and finds Dena captive upstairs, agonizing and mangled. While Jonathan is upstairs with Dena, the witch cult occupants return home. Jonathan confronts them on his way out. Still, the suspicious man from earlier continues to deny any knowledge of “Dena," but Jonathan is convinced that what he saw upstairs was real and leaves to seek help. Jonathan returns to the liquor store to seek the help of his friend, Eric, who calls the police. The police quickly arrive and arrest Jonathan.

Once again, Jonathan finds himself in the care of psychiatrist, Dr. Ronaldi, but this time at the County Psychiatric Hospital lock down unit. Dr. Ronaldi encourages him to "confront his demons" and to commit to the therapy. That night, Jonathan is attacked by the demon of his nightmares. The next morning, Dr. Ronaldi and staff find him eviscerated and dead in his bed, the ceremonial dagger in his right hand, begging the question—did he do it to himself or was he sacrificed by the witch cult who cursed him? Dr. Ronaldi phones Jonathan's parents.

The denouement finds a young woman waiting at a bus stop when the witch cult pull up to offer her a ride. She gets in and they drive off toward an uncertain fate.

Cast 
Frankie Muniz as Jonathan Marsh
Blake Webb as Eric “The ERC”
Chelsea Edmundson as Dena
Richard Handley as Dr. Jason Ronaldi
Cullen Douglas as Man in Black
Colby French as Mr. Marsh
Ravi Patel as Dr. May
Laura Richardson as Mrs Marsh
Mary K. DeVault as Melinda
Sharif Ibrahim as Orderly Wally
Alexander Ward as The Entity

Casting 
Handley and Hanson hired casting director, Jeremy Gordon, who circulated the script to talent agents in Los Angeles, California.

Late in the casting process, Gordon sent the script to Frankie Muniz and his agency, APA. Hanson and Handley later offered him the central role.

Handley also played the role of psychiatrist, “Dr. Jason Ronaldi”, while serving as lead-producer of the film.

Production

Development and pre-production 
The Black String movie began as a team thesis project for Handley and Hanson during their Master of Fine Arts (MFA) in Film and TV training at Mount Saint Mary's University, Los Angeles, California. Prior to this, a partial script was shelved for nearly a decade. The story was originally conceived by Brian Hanson and Andy Warrener. Hanson wrote a condensed rough draft of the script in 2007, but it wasn't until 2015 that Hanson and Handley went about a complete rewrite of the screenplay from beginning to end as part of their Master thesis requirement. This rewrite process took the two of them a year to complete a final draft ready for production.

About the time Hanson and Handley were finishing up their MFA degrees, they took in fellow MFA classmates, Charles Bunce and Kayli Fortun as producers to work on the project. Mount Saint Mary's University film program continually provided aid to the production, allowing the team access to campus buildings and post-production facilities until completion of the film. Richard and Brian then brought in, co-producer/actor, Sharif Ibrahim, who made introduction to the film's primary equity investor. Associate producers Marisela Handley and Yani Hanson would support the film through their location scouting/management and production accounting skillsets, respectively.

Handley and Hanson brought in Sheldon Brigman as producer, whose guidance and support during the project would prove invaluable, particularly later on during their search for distribution companies. Ultimately, Brigman would assist with global distribution and placement of the film through his company, Launch Releasing.  

Handley, Hanson, and Brigman had worked together as producers on director Adam Ripp's psychological horror film, Devil's Whisper. As such, they were able to assess and hire many of the same production professionals from that film to come work on The Black String, including First-Assistant Director, Liam Finn. Over 120 film professionals would be hired over a 4-year period to see the film through from pre-production to production to distribution.

Filming 
The first 23 days of principal photography took place in late 2016, followed by several pick up shot days scheduled throughout 2017 and 2018. Santa Clarita, California, served as the primary filming location, but the production also used various practical locations and film studio spaces throughout the Los Angeles thirty-mile studio zone, including Pölsa Rosa Ranch Studios, Middleton Ranch Studios, and Silver Dream Factory Studios. Given the campus architecture served as the perfect backdrop for Mel Brooks’ 1977 satirical comedy, High Anxiety, most of the psychiatric hospital sequences where filmed primarily on the Chalon campus at Mount Saint Mary’s University, Los Angeles, California. Access to this location was made available through its relationship to filmmakers Handley, Hanson, Bunce, and Fortun, as they are alumni and have served as faculty of the university. Handley also had connections to alternative medical clinics in the Los Angeles area that would serve as locations for other medical and psychiatric treatment facilities in the film.

Practical and prosthetic makeup effects where brought to bear through the efforts of Erik Porn’s prosthetic makeup company, Bitemares. Erik was hired to work on The Black String because of his prosthetic makeup prowess shown on a number of other notable films and TV productions, including Devil’s Whisper, Buffy The Vampire Slayer, American Horror Story, Teen Wolf, Fear of the Walking Dead, Paranormal Activity, and for his help in crafting the prosthetic metamorphosis of actor, Christian Bale, into U.S. Vice President Dick Cheney in director Adam McKay’s biographical film, Vice. These skills, in particular, would serve the production well in physically transforming Frankie Muniz's character "Jonathan" across the continuum of The Black String. Practical and prosthetic makeup artist, Dan Gilbert, created the prosthetic arm piece for Muniz that was used during the "dig it all out" sequence of the film.

Post-production 
Primary film editorial was completed by William Drucker in 2016, with Hanson coming in to complete the film edit over the following year. Film editorial was done in an iterative improvement process, wherein the editorial would necessitate conducting further reshoots of scenes and practical effects elements. Multiple audience test screenings would also further inform the editorial process.

Visual effects were completed by a number of freelance artists and visual effects companies, including Foxtrot X-ray.

Sound design was completed by Studio Unknown. Bunce, Hanson, and Kelby Thwaits would also complete much of the post-production sound design on the sound stages and within the post-production studios at Mount Saint Mary's University film program, working in conjunction with Studio Unknown.

Reception and interpretations 
The Black String prompted multiple interpretations from film critics and audience members alike as to the particular sort of Jonathan's (Muniz) extrication.

Hanson and Handley present a two-sided coin with The Black String, allowing viewers to decide for themselves, “Is Jonathan suffering from mental illness or is he truly cursed?” The film has been compared to David Robert Mitchell's, It Follows, Adrian Lyne's, Jacob's Ladder, Eric England's, Contracted, David Cronenberg's, Shivers, and Roman Polanski's, Rosemary's Baby, among many others.

Film critic, Phil Wheat states, “In terms of the genre, however, what strikes you the most about The Black String is the film’s body-horror elements, which are a mix of the work of David Cronenberg and the mythos of H.P. Lovecraft.”

The Black String received mostly positive reviews and garnered many film festival awards.

On review aggregator website Rotten Tomatoes, it holds a 86% critic approval rating.

Richard Whittaker of The Austin Chronicle states, “much of the unnerving energy depends on Muniz, who deploys his trademark brand of wired and wiry energy to keep the reality of the insanity ambiguous until the closing moments.”

Brittany Witherspoon of Film Threat mentions, “Elevating this script from a derivative and simple one is no easy task, but Muniz does it effortlessly.”

Soundtrack 
The film's soundtrack was composed by Ed Lima and added upon by the band, Devilish Trio.

Awards and accolades

Notable film festival selections 
GI Film Festival (2019) (San Diego, Premiere)
Shriekfest (2019) (Los Angeles, California)
Dances With Films (2019) (TLC Chinese Theaters, Hollywood, CA)
Sitges Film Festival (2019) (Catalonia, Spain, specializing in fantasy and horror films)
London Frightfest Film Festival (2019)(London premiere on the Cineworld IMAX auditorium screen at the Empire, Leicester Square)
Austin Film Festival (2018) (U.S. Premiere, the historic State Theater, Austin, Texas)

References 

2018 films
American psychological horror films
2010s English-language films
2010s American films